In Australian sport, the best and fairest award recognises the player(s) adjudged to have had the best performance in a game or over a season for a given sporting club or competition. The awards are sometimes dependent on not receiving a suspension for misconduct or breaching the rules during that season.

In the Australian Football League (AFL), the Brownlow Medal is awarded to the player who, provided he has not been suspended during the season, receives the most votes from the umpires for being the fairest and best player in games during the home-and-away season. In each game, the umpires award three votes to the player they judge to be the best afield in that game, two votes to the second-best player, and one vote to the third-best player. The votes are counted at a gala function on the Monday preceding the Grand Final. The eligibility of suspended or reprimanded players due to minor offences to win the award has frequently been questioned.

Another "best and fairest" honour, the Leigh Matthews Trophy, is voted on by the AFL's players and awarded by their trade union, the AFL Players Association. Unlike the Brownlow, players who have served disciplinary suspensions during the season are still eligible to win this award.

The oldest such award is the Magarey Medal, awarded to the "fairest and most brilliant" player in the South Australian National Football League (SANFL). The award was created by William Ashley Magarey—then chairman of the league—and was first awarded in 1898.

See also
List of Australian Lacrosse best and fairest players
Man of the match
Most Valuable Player
Lady Byng Memorial Trophy, a similar National Hockey League award

References

Australian Football League awards
Australian Football League
AFL Women's
Association football terminology
Rugby league terminology
Rugby union terminology
Rugby football culture
Sportsmanship trophies and awards
Sports culture in Australia